Newark is a city in Tarrant and Wise counties in the U.S. state of Texas. The population was 1,096 in 2020.

History
According to the Handbook of Texas, settlement began in the mid-1850s, referring to the community as Caddo Village because of numerous remnants of the Caddo Indian culture found along the banks of the West Fork of the Trinity River. After the Rock Island Railroad reached the town in 1893, officials surveyed town lots; the community was named after Newark, New Jersey, perhaps the hometown of G. K. Foster, the civil engineer who helped survey the town. Newark was a prosperous farming community until the 1920s. It regained its status as a retail market for area farmers by the end of the 1940s. In 1951 Newark incorporated.

Geography

Newark is located at  (33.013542, –97.488418).

Demographics

As of the 2020 United States census, there were 1,096 people, 351 households, and 280 families residing in the city.

References

External links
 City of Newark official website
  History of Newark

Dallas–Fort Worth metroplex
Cities in Tarrant County, Texas
Cities in Wise County, Texas
Cities in Texas